Neodavisia singularis is a species of snout moth in the genus Neodavisia. It was described by William Barnes and James Halliday McDunnough in 1913 and is known from the US state of Florida (where it was described from the Everglades).

The wingspan is about 12 mm.

References

Moths described in 1913
Pyralinae